The Grutten Hut is an Alpine club hut situated at a height of 1620 metres in the Kaisergebirge in Tyrol, Austria.  It is owned by the Turner Alps Kränzchen Section of the German Alpine Club. It is the highest mountain hut in the Kaiser Mountains.

Location 
The hut is located on the sunny southern side of the Wilder Kaiser ridge on a grassy terrace high above the villages of Ellmau and Going with an outstanding view that, on clear days, takes in the Großvenediger. On fine summer days, the Grutten Hut is a popular destination for hikers and an important base for mountaineers and climbers, who can set out from here on numerous Alpine tours to the summits of the Wilder Kaiser.

History 
The Grutten Hut was built in 1899 on its present site by the Alpen Turner Kränzchen Section and Carl Babenstuber and was ceremonially opened on 14 July 1900. Soon afterwards, a glass veranda, a wash house and a mule stable were built. In 1922 a separate sleeping block, the Josef Dorn Haus was built and in 1925 the then manager of the hut, Hans Eisenmann, created a climbing area through the Wilde Gschloß, the present-day Jubiläumssteig. In 1938 there were further modifications and extensions, including another sleeping block, the Emil Kempfle Haus. During the Second World War the Grutten Hut was commandeered, and it remained closed until 1951 after the border opening when there was a great influx into the Tyrol. In the 1960s, further major upgrades and extensions were added. Even after a new well was dug its supply was hardly any greater, and just before its 100th anniversary a costly sewer conduit was built. This not only ensures the supply of water and drainage, but also provides the lodge with electricity and telephone service. In 2002 the sanitary facilities were modernised and a wooden terrace was built.

Access 
By car from Kufstein drive through Scheffau to Ellmau. From Salzburg pass through Lofer and St. Johann in Tirol to Ellmau. Then branch north and finally drive along the toll road up to the  Wochenbrunner Alm (1,080 m) where there is a large car park.

Approaches 
 From Wochenbrunner Alm, take the signposted Hut Trail (Hüttenweg) to reach the hut after about 90 minutes (541 m ascent).
 From Ellmau or Scheffau take the path via the Riedl Hut and the track to the hut, duration 2½ hours (800 m ascent).
 From Going take the route via the Gaudeamus Hut and the Klamml, a steep rocky gully, duration 3 hours (800 m ascent).

Crossings 
 Gaudeamus Hut (1,270 m) via the Klamml, medium difficulty, duration: 45 minutes
 Kaindl Hut (1,318 m) along the Wilder Kaiser Trail (Steig), Walleralm and Hochegg, easy, duration: 5 hours
 Hans Berger Haus or Anton Karg Haus via Kopftörl and Hohen Winkel, difficult, duration: 4 hours
 Hans Berger Haus or Anton Karg Haus via the Rote Rinn wind gap and Scharlinger Boden, difficult, duration: 4 hours
 Stripsenjochhaus (1,577 m) along the Jubiläumssteig trail, Ellmauer Tor and Steinerne Rinne couloir, difficult, duration: 3½ hours
 Fritz Pflaum Hut (1,865 m) along the Jubiläumssteig, Gildensteig and Kleines Törl, difficult, duration: 5 hours
 Ackerl Hut (1,460 m) along the Jubiläumssteig and Wilder Kaiser Trail, medium difficulty, duration: 3 hours

Ascents 
 Ellmauer Halt (2,344 m), duration: 2½ hours
 Treffauer (2,304 m), duration: 3 hours
 Kleine Halt (2,116 m), duration: 3½ hours
 Karlspitzen (2,281 m), duration: 2½ hours
 Goinger Halt (2,193 m), duration: 2 hours
Numerous climbing routes, for example on the Kopftörl arête

Accommodation 
The hut offers the following accommodation:

 79 dormitory bedspaces
 6 double room bedspaces
 18 mattress bedspaces

There is no winter room.

Mapping 
 Alpine Club Map Sheet 8, Kaisergebirge (1:25.000)

See also
Kaiser Mountains

References

External links 
 Turner-Alpen-Kränzchen Section of the German Alpine Club 

Mountain huts in Tyrol (state)
Kaiser Mountains